Kurši may refer to:

FK Kurši, floorball team from Latvia
Kursenieki, Baltic tribe